A dance film (also known as screen dance) is a film in which dance is used to reveal the central themes of the film, whether these themes be connected to narrative or story, states of being, or more experimental and formal concerns. In such films, the creation of choreography typically exists only in film or video. At its best, dance films use filming and editing techniques to create twists in the plotline, multiple layers of reality, and emotional or psychological depth.

Dance film is also known as the cinematic interpretation of existing dance works, originally created for live performance. When existing dance works are modified for the purposes of filming this can involve a wide variety of film techniques. Depending on the amount of choreographic and/or presentational adjustment an original work is subjected to, the filmed version may be considered as dance for camera. However, these definitions are not agreed upon by those working with dance and film or video.

Examples 

Britain's DV8 Physical Theatre, founded by Lloyd Newson, is well known for its film versions of staged works. The reworking of Enter Achilles (1995) for film in 1996 is a seminal example of Dance for camera. Recently acclaimed works include The Cost of Living.

Australia's The Physical TV Company, directed by Richard James Allen and Karen Pearlman, is well known for creating original works that are a sophisticated meeting of the possibilities of cinema with those of dance. Dance films such as Rubberman Accepts The Nobel Prize (2001), No Surrender (2002), and Down Time Jaz (2003) are differing examples of the possibilities of this approach involving comedy, visual effects, drama, and animation.

The Machinima work by Chris Brandt: 'Dance, Voldo, Dance' which uses computer game characters within the game Soulcalibur to act out a live, choreographed dance. Two players simultaneously performed the dance piece using game controllers. The work existed as a live performance on screen, and has since been edited and distributed on the internet as a video work.

The Mitchell Rose's Deere John, part of his Modern Daydreams suite created with BodyVox artistic directors Jamey Hampton and Ashley Roland, that features a man doing a pas de deux with a 22-ton John Deere Excavator.

Flor Cósmica (1977), Pola Weiss Álvarez's video, presented at the ninth International VideoArt Meeting at the Carrillo Gil Museum.

The British choreographer and film maker Liz Aggiss has made several dance films, including the multi-award-winning Motion Control (2002), commissioned by BBC Dance for Camera. In 2012, on ARTE TV, she gave an interview in which she talked about screen dance and its ability to place the camera anywhere in relation to the dancer's body. Motion Control featured 'a glammed up Aggiss, fixed to the spot in nameless, enclosed space, and the camera diving and circling around here. The camera lunges at speed towards the centre of her body like a ravenous carnivorous plant, and Aggiss battles against it with all the wiles of a performer.'

Billy Cowie, who collaborated with Aggiss from 1982 to 2003, is a pioneer of 3D Dance films, shown as installations in galleries. His works include The Revery Alone. In the Flesh, Tango de Soledad, and Jenseits.

See also
Dance in film - Films that contain dance sequences but are not dance works per se
Musical film
Saturday Night Fever (1977)
Disco Dancer (1982)

References

External links
Dance Cinema Organisation
San Francisco Dance Film Festival
Sans Souci Festival of Dance Cinema
Dance Films Association
Dance Camera West
DV8 Physical Theatre
Exploring Dance Film
Liz Aggiss
Billy Cowie

 
Musical films
Music mass media
Film genres